Grotrian may refer to:

People
 Frederick Brent Grotrian (1838–1905) was an English Member of Parliament
 Herbert Grotrian (1870–1951), English Member of Parliament
 Walter Grotrian (1890–1954), German astronomer and astrophysicist

Other uses
 Grotrian (crater), a lunar crater
 Grotrian baronets, a title in the Baronetage of the United Kingdom
 Grotrian diagram, in chemistry
 Grotrian-Steinweg, a German piano brand known as Grotrian in the U.S.